Nobe is an unincorporated community in Calhoun County, West Virginia, United States.

The community most likely was named after an area resident.

References

Unincorporated communities in Calhoun County, West Virginia
Unincorporated communities in West Virginia